Adyar Ananda Bhavan (also known as AAB) is an Indian chain of vegetarian restaurants and confectioners founded in Rajapalayam and headquartered in Adyar, Chennai. It is the oldest chain of restaurants in Chennai and has 145+ outlets across India.

History

A2B was founded by late Thiru K.S. Thirupathi Raja, who was the founder of Guru Sweets in Rajapalayam, Srinivasa Sweets in Bangalore (Sriramapuram) and Sri Ananda Bhavan in Washermenpet, Chennai. This was followed by the opening of a branch in Adyar which prompted the company to add Adyar to the name Ananda Bhavan which is now called Adyar Ananda Bhavan.

Adyar Ananda Bhavan now operates with over 145 branches across India, most of which are in southern India.

The restaurant chain is now managed and run by Thiru. K.T. Venkatesan and Thiru. K.T. Srinivasa Raja, sons of founder late Thiru. K.S. Thirupathi Raja.

Operations
Started initially with Rajapalayam in 1960s and later expanded to Bengaluru (Malleswaram) in 1978 and Chennai (Royapuram) in 1980.
 Started with the brand name "Ananda Bhavan" and subsequently changed to "Adyar Ananda Bhavan".
 Started in Chennai in 1979 as Sri Ananda Bhavan in Washermanpet by Thirupathi Raja and his elder son K T Venkatesan. In 1988, opened a second outlet in Chennai in Adyar. In 1992 expanded with a third outlet in Purasaiwakkam.
 In 1994, the chain crossed 100 crore in turnover.
 Currently more than 10,000 people are employed across its outlets with 800 crore in annual turnover.
 In 2000, it expanded to Pondicherry, and reached 20 branches in Chennai with total turnover of 150 crores.
 It has branches and outlets in the United States (Herndon VA, San Jose, Dallas and New Jersey), Malaysia and Singapore.
 In 2018, Company launches food delivery app “A2B”.

Awards
 2018 The Confederation of Indian Industry (CII) Southern Region Entrepreneurs Awards to managing director of Adyar Ananda Bhavan Sweets India Private Limited K.T. Srinivasa Raja.

See also
 List of Indian restaurants
 List of vegetarian restaurants

References

External links 
 
 Platter of Joy, an article in The Hindu

Restaurants in Chennai
Catering and food service companies of India
Restaurant chains in India
Companies based in Chennai
Food and drink companies established in the 1970s
1970s establishments in Tamil Nadu
Companies with year of establishment missing
Indian restaurants
Vegetarian restaurants